Anton Eduard van Arkel, (19 November 1893 – 14 March 1976) was a Dutch chemist.

Van Arkel suggested the names "pnictogen" and "pnictide" to refer to chemical elements in group 15 (the nitrogen group or nitrogen family) of the periodic table.

Van Arkel, together with  Jan Hendrik de Boer, developed a method for the preparation of very pure tungsten: the dissociation of the vapor of tungsten chloride on an incandescent core wire known as the Van Arkel–de Boer process. 
This method was later used by himself and others for many other metals and 
non-metals. Van Arkel and de Boer thus provided the first method to fabricate pure titanium. 

Van Arkel became member of the Royal Netherlands Academy of Arts and Sciences in 1962.

See also
Crystal bar process
Hafnium
Jan Hendrik de Boer
Titanium
Van Arkel–Ketelaar triangle

References
 H.A.M. Snelders, Arkel, Anton Eduard van (1893-1976), in Biografisch Woordenboek van Nederland.
 E.J.W. Verwey: 'Levensbericht A.E. van Arkel'. In: Jaarboek KNAW, 1976, Amsterdam, pp. 184-192

1893 births
1976 deaths
20th-century Dutch chemists
People from 's-Gravenzande
Utrecht University alumni
Academic staff of Leiden University
Members of the Royal Netherlands Academy of Arts and Sciences